Frank R. Fisher (born October 18, 1926) is a jazz trumpeter, music arranger, and composer. He is one of the oldest jazz musicians in the San Francisco Bay Area still performing.

Career
Fisher is a jazz musician in the San Francisco Bay Area. He has been involved with music for over 70 years. He was a part of jazz in the Fillmore District, San Francisco, California in the 1940s and 1950s. He has been a member of the Junius Courtney Band since the 1960s.

References

External links
 Legend of Bop City, San Francisco.
 Jazz Heritage Center, San Francisco.
 Renewal in Fillmore, San Francisco
 Jazz Detective (article history and photos Fillmore District).

1926 births
African-American history in the San Francisco Bay Area
African-American jazz composers
African-American jazz musicians
African-American Methodists
American jazz trumpeters
American male trumpeters
Living people
Musicians from the San Francisco Bay Area
21st-century trumpeters
Jazz musicians from California
Jazz musicians from Texas
American male jazz composers
American jazz composers
21st-century American male musicians
21st-century African-American musicians
20th-century African-American people